Tropidonophis statisticus, the Papua New Guinea montane keelback, is a species of colubrid snake. It is found in Papua New Guinea and Indonesia.

References

Tropidonophis
Reptiles of Papua New Guinea
Reptiles of Indonesia
Snakes of New Guinea
Reptiles described in 1988